Awaqdaiin pronounced as "Owkad" is a village in Salalah, Dhofar, Oman in the Middle East.

Populated places in Oman